The 2016 Coral Scottish Open was a professional ranking snooker tournament that began on 12 December and ended on 18 December 2016 at the Commonwealth Arena in Glasgow, Scotland. It was the eleventh ranking event of the 2016/2017 season.

The Scottish Open returned as a full-ranking event, being held as part of a new Home Nations Series introduced in the 2016/2017 season with the existing Welsh Open and new English Open and Northern Ireland Open tournaments. The winner of the Scottish Open is awarded the Stephen Hendry Trophy which is named in honour of Scottish seven-time world whampion Stephen Hendry.

Ding Junhui was the defending champion but he decided not to compete this year. Marco Fu captured his third ranking title by beating John Higgins 9–4, after having trailed 1–4. He also made the tournament's highest break, a 142 in his second round 4-1 win over Liam Highfield.

Prize fund
The breakdown of prize money for this year is shown below:

 Winner: £70,000
 Runner-up: £30,000
 Semi-final: £20,000
 Quarter-final: £10,000
 Last 16: £6,000
 Last 32: £3,500
 Last 64: £2,500 

 Highest break: £2,000
 Total: £366,000
 
The "rolling 147 prize" for a maximum break stands at £5,000.

Main draw

Top half

Section 1

Section 2

Section 3

Section 4

Bottom half

Section 5

Section 6

Section 7

Section 8

Finals

Final

Century breaks

 142, 141, 135, 132, 130, 127, 113, 110, 106, 104, 100  Marco Fu
 139, 110  Mark Williams
 135, 107, 104  Neil Robertson
 134  Mike Dunn
 134  Sean O'Sullivan
 133  Jimmy White
 132, 129  Xiao Guodong
 132, 126, 113, 112, 100  Judd Trump
 132, 112  Michael White
 130  Stephen Maguire
 126, 111  Anthony Hamilton
 126, 110, 104, 101, 101, 100  John Higgins
 126  Stuart Carrington
 124, 114, 104, 103  Ronnie O'Sullivan
 121  Tom Ford
 120  Andrew Higginson
 117  Robin Hull
 116, 101  Stuart Bingham
 115  Lee Walker
 115  Liang Wenbo
 114, 109  Mark Davis
 114  Fergal O'Brien
 110  Ryan Day
 108  Hossein Vafaei
 106  Joe Perry
 106  Robert Milkins
 105  Ricky Walden
 104  Chris Wakelin
 103  Yu Delu
 102  Gary Wilson
 102  Mark Allen
 101, 100  Barry Hawkins
 101  Kyren Wilson
 100, 100  Shaun Murphy

References

Home Nations Series
2016
2016 in snooker
2016 in Scottish sport
2016 Scottish Open
December 2016 sports events in the United Kingdom